Tarabel is a commune in the Haute-Garonne department in southwestern France. It has a primary school and its iconic brick castle situated near the church. The town's wealth a prestige reached its apogee in the early 16th century. It also played a minor role in the Albigensian Crusades.

Population

See also
Communes of the Haute-Garonne department

References

Communes of Haute-Garonne